Ouda may refer to:

People
 Bassem Ouda (born 1970), Egyptian politician
 Khaled bin Ouda bin Mohammed al-Harbi
 Ouda Tarabin (born 1981), Israeli bedouin
 Salman al-Ouda
 Waleed Ouda (born 1973), Palestinian novelist

Places
 
 Ōuda, Nara, Japan

Other
 OUDA, callsign for HDMY Dannebrog (A540)
 Ongole Urban Development Authority